Valleyarm is a digital content distribution company that was founded in 2009. Initially, the company focused on digital music delivery, working primarily with independent artists and record labels to distribute content globally. Artists and labels have included Gotye, Silverchair, Missy Higgins, Devo, Shock Records, and Eleven Music.

In 2012, Valleyarm extended its services to include YouTube channel management and optimisation services for content owners and creators. Current clients include Turner Broadcasting, Beyond International, Southern Cross Austereo, and Moshcam.

Valleyarm have offices in Melbourne and Sydney, Australia.

History 
Valleyarm was founded in 2009 by a group of music industry execs as a digital music distribution platform. On July 8, 2010, Valleyarm acquired Brisbane-based competitor Musicadium.

By 2012 Valleyarm had broadened their services to include YouTube channel management, and were invited by Google to become a multi-channel network (MCN) partner. By 2014 Google considered Valleyarm the largest MCN in the Asia-Pacific (APAC) region. Their network includes over 160 channels of content owners and creators that generates over 300 million views and 1.5 billion minutes watched per month.

In 2016, former BMG, Warner Music Australia and ARIA executive Ed St John joined the board of directors. In 2017, former Warner Music Australia and Murdoch Books executive Mark Ashbridge joined as Managing Director.

Current artists and labels 
Below are a list of selected artists and labels currently with Valleyarm:

Wheatley Records
Half A Cow Records
Devo
Vanessa Amorosi
The Fauves
Dragon

Current YouTube clients 
Below are a list of selected content owners and creators currently with Valleyarm:

Turner Broadcasting
Beyond International
Southern Cross Austereo

References 

Online music stores of Australia
Companies based in Melbourne